The Pennsylvania State Game Lands Number 48 are Pennsylvania State Game Lands in Bedford County in Pennsylvania in the United States providing hunting, bird watching, and other activities.

Geography
SGL 48 consists of two parcels located in Bedford, Cumberland Valley, Harrison, and Londonderry Townships in Bedford County near the boroughs of Manns Choice and the villages of Bedford, Bedford Springs, Burning Bush, Buffalo Mills, and Rockville. SGL 48 straddles Wills Mountain and into parts of the Cumberland Valley and the Milligan Cove. It also extends into a small area of the eastern slope of Buffalo Mountain. U.S. Route 220 parallels the eastern border of the Game Lands.

Statistics

Biology
Hunting and furtaking species include bear (Ursus americanus), white-tailed deer (Odocoileus virginianus), gray fox (Urocyon cinereoargenteus), red fox (Vulpes Vulpes), pheasant (Phasianus colchicus), rabbit (Sylvilagus floridanus), Raccoon (Procyon lotor), (Sciurus carolinensis), and turkey (Meleagris gallopavo), and Woodcock (Scolopax minor).

See also
 Pennsylvania State Game Lands
 Pennsylvania State Game Lands Number 26, also located in Bedford County
 Pennsylvania State Game Lands Number 41, also located in Bedford County
 Pennsylvania State Game Lands Number 49, also located in Bedford County
 Pennsylvania State Game Lands Number 73, also located in Bedford County
 Pennsylvania State Game Lands Number 97, also located in Bedford County
 Pennsylvania State Game Lands Number 104, also located in Bedford County
 Pennsylvania State Game Lands Number 261, also located in Bedford County

References

048
Protected areas of Bedford County, Pennsylvania